Aiguille de Scolette (in French) or Pierre Menue (in Italian)  is a mountain of Savoie (F) and of the province of Turin (I). It lies in the Cottian Alps and has an elevation of 3,506 metres above sea level.

Geography 
The mountain is the highest peak of Cottian Alps outside the Monviso area.

In the French subdivision of Western Alps it belongs to the Massif du Mont-Cenis.
 
Administratively the mountain is divided between the commune of Avrieux (F - north-west and north-east faces) and the comune of Bardonecchia (I - southern face).

On its Italian side at 1,979 metres above sea level stands the artificial lake of Rochemolles while on the French side is situated the small lake of Scolette (2686 metres).

Access to the summit 

The easiest route for the summit starts from the Col de Pelouse, which connects Avrieux and Bardonecchia, and follows the SW ridge and then the NW face of the mountain.

Notes

Maps

 Italian official cartography (Istituto Geografico Militare - IGM); on-line version: www.pcn.minambiente.it
 French  official cartography (Institut Géographique National - IGN); on-line version:  www.geoportail.fr
 I.G.C. (Istituto Geografico Centrale): Carta dei sentieri e dei rifugi  1:50.000 scale n.1 Valli di Susa Chisone e Germanasca and 1:25.000 scale n.104 Bardonecchia Monte Thabor Sauze d'Oulx

Mountains of Savoie
Mountains of Piedmont
Mountains of the Alps
Alpine three-thousanders
France–Italy border
International mountains of Europe
Mountains partially in France
Mountains partially in Italy
Three-thousanders of Italy
Three-thousanders of France